is a former Japanese football player.

Playing career
Fukunaga was born in Machida on March 6, 1973. After graduating from Aoyama Gakuin University, he joined Urawa Reds in 1995. He played many matches as forward from first season. However he could hardly play in the match for Guillain–Barré syndrome in 1997. From 1998, he played many matches as mainly central midfielder. However his opportunity to play decreased in 2001 and he moved to newly was promoted to J1 League club, Vegalta Sendai in 2002. However he could not play many matches and retired end of 2003 season.

Club statistics

References

External links

YOU

1973 births
Living people
Aoyama Gakuin University alumni
Association football people from Tokyo
Japanese footballers
J1 League players
J2 League players
Urawa Red Diamonds players
Vegalta Sendai players
Association football midfielders